Giovo (Gióf in local dialect) is a comune (municipality) in Trentino, located about  northeast of Trento in northern Italy.

People
The village of Palù di Giovo is home to several professional road bicycle racers:

Francesco Moser - cyclist (now turned local politician).
Gilberto Simoni - cyclist 
Moreno Moser - cyclist

References

Cities and towns in Trentino-Alto Adige/Südtirol